OK Jaanu is a 2017 Indian Hindi-language romantic drama film directed by Shaad Ali, with screenplay and story based on Mani Ratnam's Tamil film O Kadhal Kanmani, and produced by Ratnam and Karan Johar under their banners Madras Talkies and Dharma Productions respectively. It is a remake of Ratnam's Tamil film O Kadhal Kanmani. The film stars Aditya Roy Kapur and Shraddha Kapoor with a supporting cast including Naseeruddin Shah and Leela Samson, the latter of whom appeared in the original as well marking her Hindi debut with this too- who essay the protagonists' landlords. Eesh Kakkar plays Tara's ex-boyfriend. A. R. Rahman composed the film's score and soundtrack. Gulzar has written the lyrics and the dialogues for the film.

Plot
Aditya "Adi" Gunjal (Aditya Roy Kapur) comes to Mumbai to work for a gaming company owned by his boss (Prahlad Kakkar), aspiring to make it big in the United States as a video game developer. At Mumbai railway station, he spots a girl (Shraddha Kapoor) on the adjacent platform trying to jump in front of an approaching train. A horrified Adi gives her a shout. The girl then disappears.

Adi moves into Gopi Srivastava's house (Naseeruddin Shah), his elder brother's senior, a strict, retired High Court judge living with his wife Charu (Leela Samson). Charu is a renowned Hindustani classical singer who suffers from stage two Alzheimer's disease. On his first day at work, Adi is encouraged by his friend Bantee to pitch the idea of his game "Mumbai 2.0" to his boss. Adi impresses his boss and gets a deadline of five months to prepare a prototype for Los Angeles for a competition.

Later, while at his friend Jenny's wedding, Adi spots the girl from the station. The girl introduces herself as Tara Agnihotri. Adi learns that Tara is planning to pursue architectural studies in Paris, and he says that he dreams of becoming a big shot like Mark Zuckerberg. Adi and Tara strike a chord over their mutual presumptions on the dysfunctionality of the institution of marriage. Tara also reveals that her antic at the railway station was a ploy to get rid of her ex-boyfriend, who desired to marry her. Subsequently, they hang out, exploring the city.
The next day, Adi pursues Tara to Ahmedabad on her work trip. Tara takes Adi to Sabarmati Ashram, which she used to visit with her father as a kid. She discloses that her decision never to marry was incited by her parents' broken marriage. Adi and Tara decide to live with each other before they go their separate ways for their respective careers. The two approach Gopi and Charu with their wish. Gopi initially strongly disagrees with their desire but then decides to give in when Tara impresses Charu with her classical singing ability.

Adi's family plans to give Adi a surprise visit, and his sister-in-law finds out that he is living with Tara, which his brother would adamantly be opposed to. She asks Tara to ponder their future when Tara, at some point, would have to pick between her love and her career. Tara and Adi continue living happily, getting a thrill out of their endearing mutual camaraderie and growing affinity and attachment.

Tara's admission to the institute in Paris gets approved. Tara informs Gopi of this and confides in him that it might now be hard for her to leave Adi and go so far away. The next day, Tara goes to Jaipur for a work trip, and Adi starts to miss her profoundly. Adi gets summoned to Kanpur by Tara's affluent mother, who wishes to know her daughter's intentions. As a result, Tara finds Adi missing when she returns from Jaipur and searches for him miserably, realizing that living without him would make her sad.

Tara and Adi begin to understand the importance of each other's presence in their life, especially after seeing the love and patience Gopi has for his ailing wife. One day, she goes missing as she bewilderingly forgets the way to her own house and is found by Tara and Adi sitting on a temple platform in heavy rain.

Tara's mother visits Adi's family to discuss marriage, infuriating Tara. Later in the day, Adi's game, "Mumbai 2.0," gets selected for the competition in Los Angeles, meaning that he has to leave for the United States soon. He confides in Jenny that it'd be hard for him to go to Tara. Tara, too, seems visibly vexed. The next day, Adi and Tara make a pact to enjoy themselves to the fullest for the next ten days, after which they will eventually go their separate ways.

One day, Charu goes missing again. While looking for her, they start bickering about their relationship. However, after finding Charu and bringing her home back to her husband, Adi finally proposes marriage to Tara before leaving for their respective destinations. They get married in Gopi's house among close friends and family.

Post marriage, both continue to accomplish their dreams, one in Paris and the other in Los Angeles, keeping in touch and waiting for the day to be together again.

{ An end credits roll plays the rest of their story in animation, with them finally living together one day and starting a family. }

Cast 
Aditya Roy Kapur as Aditya "Adi" Gunjal.
Shraddha Kapoor as Tara Gunjal ( Nee' Agnihotri) (Few lines as Mona Ghosh Shetty). 
Naseeruddin Shah as Gopi "Paplu" Srivastava
Leela Samson as Charu "Baby" Srivastava
 Jasmeet Singh Bhatia as Bantu
 Eesh Kakkar as Romi, Tara's ex-boyfriend
 Kitu Gidwani as Tara's Mother
 Sanjay Gurbaxani as Deputy Commissioner of Police
 Sarika Singh as Adi's Sister in Law
 Vibhoutee Sharma as Jennifer
 Vijayant Kohli as Ravi Gunjal (Adi's Brother)
Prahlad Kakkar as Adi's boss
Boloram Das as a security guard

Soundtrack 

The film score and soundtrack are composed by A. R. Rahman while the lyrics for songs are written by Gulzar. Rahman re-used most of his compositions from the Tamil soundtrack of O Kadhal Kanmani, with the exception of three songs. He composed two new songs for the film which are the Hindi counterparts of  "Aye Sinamika" and "Malargal Kaetten" that were part of the Tamil version. The Hindi counterpart of "Parandhu Sella Vaa" is a cover version of Rahman's yesteryear classic "Humma Humma" from Ratnam's 1995 Tamil film Bombay. Dubbed as "The Humma Song", the cover was done by Badshah and Tanishk Bagchi. The full soundtrack was released by Sony Music India on 4 January 2017.

Box office

Reception
Ok Jaanu garnered mixed to negative reviews from critics. Bollywood Hungama rated the film 2.5 out of 5 stars, stating that it is "a decent love story which works only in parts mainly because of the chemistry between Aditya Roy Kapur and Shraddha Kapoor."

Writing for Hindustan Times, Anupama Chopra rated the film 2 out of 5, commenting, "This is just a pointless film, because an exact frame-for-frame version already exists in Tamil", referring to O Kadhal Kanmani, directed by Mani Ratnam. Chopra described Kapur and Kapoor as "too lightweight" to bring a comparable depth to the characters that the original actors did.

Accolades

References

External links 
 
 
 

2017 films
Hindi remakes of Tamil films
2010s Hindi-language films
Films set in Mumbai
Films scored by A. R. Rahman
Indian films with live action and animation
2017 romantic drama films
Indian romantic drama films
Fox Star Studios films
Films directed by Shaad Ali